Libuna is a monotypic moth genus of the family Crambidae described by Frederic Moore in 1886. It contains only one species, Libuna solitella, described by Francis Walker in 1866, which is found in Sri Lanka.

References

Crambinae
Monotypic moth genera
Moths of Sri Lanka
Crambidae genera
Taxa named by Frederic Moore